The following outline is provided as an overview of and topical guide to human anatomy:

Human anatomy – scientific study of the morphology of the adult human. It is subdivided into gross anatomy and microscopic anatomy.  Gross anatomy (also called topographical anatomy, regional anatomy, or anthropotomy) is the study of anatomical structures that can be seen by unaided vision.  Microscopic anatomy is the study of minute anatomical structures assisted with microscopes, and includes histology (the study of the organization of tissues), and cytology (the study of cells).

Essence of human anatomy 
 Human body
 Anatomy

Branches of human anatomy 
 Gross anatomy- systemic or region-wise study of human body parts and organs. Gross anatomy encompasses cadaveric anatomy and osteology
 Microscopic anatomy/histology 
 Cell biology (Cytology) & cytogenetics
 Surface anatomy
 Radiological anatomy
 Developmental anatomy/embryology

Anatomy of the human body 

The following list of human anatomical structures is based on the Terminologia Anatomica, the international standard for anatomical nomenclature.  While the order is standardized, the hierarchical relationships in the TA are somewhat vague, and thus are open to interpretation.

General anatomy
Parts of human body
Head
Ear
Face
Forehead
Cheek
Chin
Eye
Nose
Nostril
Mouth
Lip
Tongue
Tooth
Neck
Trunk
Thorax
Abdomen
Pelvis
Back
Upper limb
Pectoral girdle
Shoulder
Arm
Axilla
Elbow
Forearm
Wrist
Hand
Finger
Thumb
Lower limb
Pelvic girdle
Leg
Buttocks
Hip
Thigh
Knee
Calf
Foot
Ankle
Heel
Toe
Sole
Cavities
Cranial cavity
Spinal cavity
Thoracic cavity
Abdominopelvic cavity
Abdominal cavity
Pelvic cavity
Planes, lines, and regions
Regions of head
Regions of neck
Anterior and lateral thoracic regions
Abdominal regions
Regions of back
Perineal regions
Regions of upper limb
Regions of lower limb

Bones

General terms
Bony part
Cortical bone
Compact bone
Spongy bone
Cartilaginous part
Membranous part
Periosteum
Perichondrium
Axial skeleton
Appendicular skeleton
Long bone
Short bone
Flat bone
Irregular bone
Pneumatized bone
Sesamoid bone
Diaphysis
Epiphysis
Epiphysial plate (Growth plate)
Metaphysis
Apophysis
Tuber
Tubercle
Tuberosity
Eminence (anatomy)
Process
Condyle
Epicondyle
Fossa
Medullary cavity
Endosteum
Yellow bone marrow
Red bone marrow
Nutrient foramen
Nutrient canal
Ossification center
Cranium
Neurocranium
Viscerocranium
Cranial cavity
Forehead
Occiput
Nasion
Bregma
Lambda
Inion
Pterion
Asterion
Gonion
Temporal fossa
Zygomatic arch
Infratemporal fossa
Pterygopalatine fossa
Pterygomaxillary fissure
Fontanelles
Anterior fontanelle
Posterior fontanelle
Sphenoidal fontanelle
Mastoid fontanelle
Calvaria
Vertex
Diploe
Cranial base
Internal surface of cranial base
Petrosphenoidal fissure
Petro-occipital fissure
Anterior cranial fossa
Middle cranial fossa
Posterior cranial fossa
Clivus
External surface of cranial base
Jugular foramen
Foramen lacerum
Bony palate
Greater palatine canal
Greater palatine foramen
Lesser palatine foramina
Incisive fossa
Incisive canals
Incisive foramina
Orbit
Orbital cavity
Medial wall
Anterior ethmoidal foramen
Posterior ethmoidal foramen
Superior orbital fissure
Inferior orbital fissure
Nasolacrimal canal
Bony nasal cavity
Piriform aperture
Superior nasal meatus
Middle nasal meatus
Inferior nasal meatus
Spheno-ethmoidal recess
Choana
Sphenopalatine foramen
Bones of cranium
Parietal bone
Frontal bone
Squamous part
External surface
Glabella
Frontal suture
Supra-orbital margin
Supra-orbital notch (Supra-orbital foramen)
Internal surface
Foramen cecum
Frontal sinus
Occipital bone
Foramen magnum
Occipital condyle
Condylar canal
Hypoglossal canal
Condylar fossa
Jugular tubercle
Jugular notch
Jugular process
External occipital protuberance
Superior nuchal line
Inferior nuchal line
Internal occipital protuberance
Sphenoid
Body
Sella turcica
Tuberculum sellae
Hypophysial fossa
Dorsum sellae
Posterior clinoid process
Sphenoidal sinus
Lesser wing
Optic canal
Anterior clinoid process
Superior orbital fissure
Greater wing
Foramen rotundum
Foramen ovale
Sphenoidal emissary foramen
Foramen spinosum
Foramen petrosum
Pterygoid process
Pterygoid notch
Pterygoid fossa
Scaphoid fossa
Pterygoid hamulus
Pterygoid canal
Temporal bone
Petrous part
Mastoid process
Occipital groove
Mastoid foramen
Facial canal
Inferior surface of petrous part
Styloid process
Stylomastoid foramen
Tympanic cavity
Mandibular fossa
Articular tubercle
Petrotympanic fissure
Petrosquamous fissure
Ethmoid
Cribriform plate
Cribriform foramina
Crista galli
Ethmoidal labyrinth
Ethmoidal bulla
Inferior nasal concha
Lacrimal bone
Nasal bone
Vomer
Maxilla
Body of maxilla
Orbital surface
Infra-orbital canal
Infra-orbital groove
Anterior surface
Infra-orbital foramen
Maxillary sinus
Palatine process
Incisive canals
Alveolar process
Dental alveoli
Incisive foramina
Palatine bone
Zygomatic bone
Zygomatico-orbital foramen
Zygomaticofacial foramen
Zygomaticotemporal foramen
Mandible
Body of mandible
Mental protuberance
Mental tubercle
Mental foramen
Oblique line
Superior mental spine
Inferior mental spine
Mylohyoid line
Sublingual fossa
Submandibular fossa
Alveolar part
Dental alveoli
Ramus of mandible
Angle of mandible
Mandibular foramen
Mandibular canal
Mylohyoid groove
Coronoid process
Mandibular notch
Condylar process
Pterygoid fovea
Hyoid bone
(Auditory ossicles - see sense organs)
Vertebral column
Vertebral canal
Vertebra (this category contains parts of a vertebra)
Vertebral body
Vertebral arch
Pedicle
Lamina
Intervertebral foramen
Superior vertebral notch
Inferior vertebral notch
Vertebral foramen
Spinous process
Transverse process
Cervical vertebrae
Uncus of body
Foramen transversarium
Carotid tubercle
Atlas (anatomy)
Axis (anatomy)
Dens
Vertebra prominens (C7)
Thoracic vertebrae
Lumbar vertebrae
Sacrum
Dorsal surface
Sacral cornu
Sacral canal
Sacral hiatus
Coccyx
Thoracic skeleton
Ribs
True ribs
False ribs
Floating ribs
Costal cartilage
Rib
Body
Costal groove
Cervical rib
First rib
Scalene tubercle
Lumbar rib
Sternum
Manubrium of sternum
Clavicular notch
Jugular notch
Sternal angle
Xiphoid process
Thoracic cage
Thoracic cavity
Superior thoracic aperture (thoracic inlet)
Inferior thoracic aperture
Intercostal space
Infrasternal angle
Bones of upper limb
Pectoral girdle
Scapula
Acromion
Superior border
Suprascapular notch
Glenoid cavity
Supraglenoid tubercle
Infraglenoid tubercle
Coracoid process
Clavicle
Acromial end
Tuberosity for coracoclavicular ligament
Conoid tubercle
Trapezoid line
Free part of upper limb
Humerus
Greater tubercle
Lesser tubercle
Intertubercular sulcus
Shaft of humerus
Posterior surface
Radial groove
Deltoid tuberosity
Condyle of humerus
Capitulum
Trochlea
Olecranon fossa
Coronoid fossa
Radial fossa
Medial epicondyle
Lateral epicondyle
Radius
Radial styloid process
Ulna
Olecranon
Coronoid process
Head
Ulnar styloid process
Bones of hand
Carpal bones
Scaphoid
Lunate
Triquetrum
Pisiform
Trapezium
Trapezoid
Capitate
Hamate
Metacarpals
Phalanges (hand)
Sesamoid bones (hand)
Bones of lower limb
Pelvic girdle
[Sacrum - see vertebrae section]
Hip bone
Acetabulum
Obturator foramen
Greater sciatic notch
Ilium
Arcuate line
Iliac crest
Anterior superior iliac spine
Anterior inferior iliac spine
Posterior superior iliac spine
Posterior inferior iliac spine
Ischium
Lesser sciatic notch MN
Pubis
Body
Pubic tubercle
Superior pubic ramus
Pecten pubis
Pelvis (category contains general terms)
Pelvic cavity
Pubic arch
Subpubic angle
Greater pelvis
Lesser pelvis
Linea terminalis
Pelvic inlet
Pelvic outlet
Free part of lower limb
Femur
Greater trochanter
Lesser trochanter
Intertrochanteric line
Intertrochanteric crest
Shaft of femur
Linea aspera
Pectineal line
Intercondylar fossa
Patella
Tibia
Medial malleolus
Fibula
Lateral malleolus
Bones of foot
Tarsal bones
Talus
Calcaneus
Sustentaculum tali
Navicular
Medial cuneiform
Intermediate cuneiform
Lateral cuneiform
Cuboid
Metatarsals
Phalanges (foot)
Sesamoid bones (foot)

Joints 
General terms
Joint
Bony joints
Synarthrosis
Fibrous joint
Syndesmosis
Gomphosis
Interosseous membrane
Suture
Cartilaginous joint
Synchondrosis
Symphysis
Epiphysial cartilage
Synovial joint
Articular disc
Meniscus
Synovial bursa
Synovial sheath
Plane joint
Cylindrical joint
Pivot joint
Hinge joint
Bicondylar joint
Saddle joint
Condylar joint
Ball and socket joint
Abduction
Adduction
External rotation or Lateral rotation
Internal rotation or Medial rotation
Circumduction
Flexion
Extension
Pronation
Supination
Opposition
Reposition
Joints of the skull
Cranial fibrous joints
Cranial syndesmoses
Cranial sutures
Coronal suture
Sagittal suture
Lambdoid suture
Dento-alveolar syndesmosis (gomphosis)
Cranial cartilaginous joints
Cranial synchondroses
Cranial synovial joints
Temporomandibular joint
Sphenomandibular ligament
Stylomandibular ligament
Atlanto-occipital joint
Vertebral joints
Syndesmoses of vertebral column
Interspinous ligaments
Ligamenta flava
Intertransverse ligaments
Supraspinous ligament
Ligamentum nuchae
Anterior longitudinal ligament
Posterior longitudinal ligament
Transverse ligaments
Synchondroses of vertebral column
Intervertebral joint
Intervertebral disc
Anulus fibrosus
Nucleus pulposus
Vertebral synovial joints
Median atlanto-axial joint
Alar ligaments
Apical ligament of dens
Cruciate ligament of dens
Lateral atlanto-axial joint
Zygapophysial joints
Lumbosacral joint
Sacrococcygeal joint
Thoracic joints
Syndesmoses of thorax
External intercostal membrane
Internal intercostal membrane
Synchondroses of thorax
Costosternal joint
Synchondrosis of first rib
Sternal synchondroses
Xiphisternal joint
Manubriosternal joint
Synovial joints of thorax
Costovertebral joints
Sternocostal joints
Costochondral joints
Interchondral joints
Joints of upper limb
Joints of pectoral girdle
Syndesmoses of pectoral girdle
Coraco-acromial ligament
Superior transverse scapular ligament
Synovial joints of pectoral girdle
Acromioclavicular joint
Acromioclavicular ligament
Coracoclavicular ligament
Trapezoid ligament
Conoid ligament
Sternoclavicular joint
Joints of free upper limb
Radio-ulnar syndesmosis
Interosseous membrane of forearm
Synovial joints of free upper limb
Glenohumeral joint
Elbow joint (since merged with elbow article)
Humeroulnar joint
Humeroradial joint
Proximal radio-ulnar joint
Ulnar collateral ligament
Radial collateral ligament
Anular ligament of radius
Quadrate ligament
Distal radio-ulnar joint
Joints of hand
Wrist joint
Carpal joints
Midcarpal joint
Radiate carpal ligament
Pisiform joint
Pisohamate ligament
Pisometacarpal ligament
Carpal tunnel
Ulnar canal
Carpometacarpal joints
Carpometacarpal joint of thumb
Intermetacarpal joints
Metacarpophalangeal joints
Deep transverse metacarpal ligament
Interphalangeal joints of hand
Joints of lower limb
Joints of pelvic girdle
Syndesmoses of pelvic girdle
Obturator canal
Pubic symphysis
Sacro-iliac joint
Sacrotuberous ligament
Sacrospinous ligament
Greater sciatic foramen
Lesser sciatic foramen
Joints of free lower limb
Tibiofibular syndesmosis
Interosseous membrane of leg
Synovial joints of free lower limb
Hip joint
Iliofemoral ligament
Ischiofemoral ligament
Pubofemoral ligament
Transverse acetabular ligament
Ligament of head of femur
Knee joint
Lateral meniscus
Medial meniscus
Transverse ligament of knee
Anterior cruciate ligament
Posterior cruciate ligament
Fibular collateral ligament
Tibial collateral ligament
Oblique popliteal ligament
Arcuate popliteal ligament
Patellar ligament
Tibiofibular joint
Joints of foot
Ankle joint
Medial ligament (deltoid ligament)
Lateral ligaments 
Anterior talofibular ligament
Posterior talofibular ligament
Calcaneofibular ligament.  
Subtalar joint
Transverse tarsal joint
Cuneonavicular joint
Intercuneiform joints
Tarsal ligaments
Tarsal interosseous ligaments
Dorsal tarsal ligaments
Dorsal cuneonavicular ligament
Plantar tarsal ligaments
Plantar calcaneonavicular ligament (Spring ligament)
Tarsometatarsal joints
Intermetatarsal joints
Metatarsophalangeal joints
Interphalangeal joints of foot

Muscles

General terms
 Muscle
Muscles of head
Extra-ocular muscles (see sense organs)
Muscles of auditory ossicles (see sense organs)
Facial muscles
Epicranius
Procerus
Nasalis
Depressor septi nasi
Orbicularis oculi
Corrugator supercilii
Depressor supercilii
Auricularis anterior
Auricularis superior
Auricularis posterior
Orbicularis oris
Depressor anguli oris
Transversus menti
Risorius
Zygomaticus major
Zygomaticus minor
Levator labii superioris
Levator labii superioris alaeque nasi
Depressor labii inferioris
Levator anguli oris
Modiolus
Buccinator
Mentalis
Masticatory muscles
Masseter
Temporalis
Lateral pterygoid
Medial pterygoid
Muscles of tongue - see alimentary system
Muscles of soft palate and fauces - see alimentary system
Muscles of neck
Platysma
Longus colli
Longus capitis
Scalenus anterior
Scalenus medius
Scalenus posterior
Sternocleidomastoid
Suboccipital muscles
Rectus capitis anterior
Rectus capitis lateralis
Rectus capitis posterior major
Rectus capitis posterior minor
Obliquus capitis superior
Obliquus capitis inferior
Suprahyoid muscles
Digastric
Stylohyoid
Mylohyoid
Geniohyoid
Infrahyoid muscles
Sternohyoid
Omohyoid
Sternothyroid
Thyrohyoid
Cervical fascia
Muscles of back
Trapezius
Latissimus dorsi
Rhomboid major
Rhomboid minor
Levator scapulae
Serratus posterior inferior
Serratus posterior superior
Anterior cervical intertransversarii
Lateral posterior cervical intertransversarii
Intertransversarii laterales lumborum
Muscles of back proper
Erector spinae
Erector spinae aponeurosis
Iliocostalis
Longissimus
Spinalis
Spinotransversales
Splenius
Transversospinales
Multifidus
Semispinalis
Rotatores
Interspinales
Intertransversarii
Thoracolumbar fascia
Muscles of thorax
Pectoralis major
Pectoralis minor
Subclavius
Serratus anterior
Levatores costarum
External intercostal muscle
Internal intercostal muscle
Innermost intercostal muscle
Subcostales
Transversus thoracis
Pectoral fascia
Clavipectoral fascia
Thoracic fascia
Endothoracic fascia
Thoracic diaphragm
Lumbar part
Right crus of diaphragm
Left crus of diaphragm
Median arcuate ligament
Medial arcuate ligament
Lateral arcuate ligament
Aortic hiatus
Esophageal hiatus
Caval opening
Muscles of abdomen
Rectus abdominis
Pyramidalis
External oblique
Inguinal ligament
Superficial inguinal ring
Internal oblique
Cremaster
Transversus abdominis
Inguinal falx
Deep inguinal ring
Linea alba
Linea semilunaris
Inguinal canal
Quadratus lumborum
Abdominal fascia
Pelvic fascia
Pelvic diaphragm
Levator ani
Ischiococcygeus
External anal sphincter
Perineal muscles - see genital systems
Muscles of upper limb
Compartments
Muscles
Deltoid
Supraspinatus
Infraspinatus
Teres minor
Teres major
Subscapularis
Biceps brachii
Coracobrachialis
Brachialis
Triceps brachii
Anconeus
Pronator teres
Flexor carpi radialis
Palmaris longus
Flexor digitorum superficialis
Flexor digitorum profundus
Flexor pollicis longus
Pronator quadratus
Brachioradialis
Extensor carpi radialis longus
Extensor carpi radialis brevis
Extensor digitorum
Extensor digiti minimi
Extensor carpi ulnaris
Supinator
Abductor pollicis longus
Extensor pollicis brevis
Extensor pollicis longus
Extensor indicis
Palmaris brevis
Abductor pollicis brevis
Flexor pollicis brevis
Opponens pollicis
Adductor pollicis
Abductor digiti minimi
Flexor digiti minimi brevis
Opponens digiti minimi
Lumbricals of hand
Dorsal interossei (of hand)
Palmar interossei (of hand)
Fascia
Flexor retinaculum
Muscles of lower limb
Compartments
Muscles
Iliopsoas
Iliacus
Psoas major
Gluteus maximus
Gluteus medius
Gluteus minimus
Tensor fasciae latae
Piriformis
Obturator internus
Gemellus superior
Gemellus inferior
Quadriceps femoris
Rectus femoris
Vastus lateralis
Vastus intermedius
Vastus medialis
Articularis genus
Pectineus
Adductor longus
Adductor brevis
Adductor magnus
Gracilis
Obturator externus
Biceps femoris
Semitendinosus
Semimembranosus
Tibialis anterior
Extensor digitorum longus
Fibularis tertius
Extensor hallucis longus
Fibularis longus
Fibularis brevis
Triceps surae
Gastrocnemius
Soleus
Calcaneal tendon
Plantaris
Popliteus
Tibialis posterior
Flexor digitorum longus
Flexor hallucis longus
Extensor hallucis brevis
Extensor digitorum brevis
Abductor hallucis
Flexor hallucis brevis
Adductor hallucis
Abductor digiti minimi
Flexor digiti minimi brevis
Flexor digitorum brevis
Quadratus plantae
Lumbricals
Dorsal interossei
Plantar interossei
Fascia
Fascia lata
Iliotibial tract
Adductor canal
Femoral canal
Femoral triangle
Femoral ring
Femoral septum
Tendon sheaths and bursae
Bursae of neck
Bursae of upper limb
Tendinous sheaths of upper limb
Bursae of lower limb
Tendinous sheaths of lower limb

Alimentary system

Human gastrointestinal tract
Mouth
Oral cavity
Oral vestibule
Oral cavity proper
Glands of mouth
Major salivary glands
Parotid gland
Sublingual gland
Submandibular gland
Minor salivary glands
Teeth
Incisor tooth
Tongue
Muscles of tongue
Genioglossus
Hyoglossus
Styloglossus
Superior longitudinal muscle
Inferior longitudinal muscle
Transverse muscle
Vertical muscle
Palatoglossus
Fauces
Muscles of soft palate and fauces
Levator veli palatini
Tensor veli palatini
Musculus uvulae
Palatoglossus
Palatopharyngeus
Pharynx
Nasopharynx
Oropharynx
Laryngopharynx
Pharyngeal muscles
Superior pharyngeal constrictor
Middle pharyngeal constrictor
Inferior pharyngeal constrictor
Stylopharyngeus
Salpingopharyngeus
Palatopharyngeus - see 'Muscles of soft palate and fauces'
Esophagus
Stomach
Pylorus
Small intestine
Duodenum
Jejunum
Ileum
Large intestine
Cecum
Appendix
Colon
Ascending colon
Transverse colon
Descending colon
Sigmoid colon
Rectum
Anal canal
Pectinate line
Liver
Common hepatic duct
Gall bladder
Cystic duct
Bile duct
Pancreas
Pancreatic islets

Respiratory system

Nose
Nasal cavity
Nasal septum
Spheno-ethmoidal recess
Superior nasal meatus
Middle nasal meatus
Inferior nasal meatus
Paranasal sinuses
Maxillary sinus
Larynx
Laryngeal cartilages and joints
Thyroid cartilage
Cricoid cartilage
Cricothyroid joint
Arytenoid cartilage
Crico-arytenoid joint
Corniculate cartilage
Cuneiform cartilage
Epiglottis
Laryngeal muscles
Cricothyroid
Laryngeal cavity
Glottis
Trachea
Carina of trachea
Bronchi
Lungs
Bronchopulmonary segments
Bronchioles

Thoracic cavity

Thoracic cavity

The thoracic cavity is the chamber of the body of vertebrates that is protected by the thoracic wall. The central compartment of the thoracic cavity is the mediastinum.

Urinary system

Urinary system
Kidney
Nephrons
Renal arteries
Renal veins
Renal pelvis
Ureter
Urinary bladder
Female urethra
Male urethra

Genital systems

Reproductive system
 Female reproductive system
Female internal genitalia
Ovary
Ligament of ovary
Suspensory ligament of ovary
Uterine tube
Uterus
Cervix of uterus
Round ligament of uterus
Pubocervical ligament
Cardinal ligament
Uterosacral ligament
Vagina
Hymen
Epoophoron
Paroophoron
Female external genitalia
Pudendum (vulva)
Mons pubis
Labium majus
Pudendal cleft
Labium minus
Vestibule of vagina
Bulb of vestibule
Greater vestibular gland
Clitoris
Female urethra
 Male reproductive system
Male internal genitalia
Testis
Tunica vaginalis
Tunica albuginea
Seminiferous tubules
Straight tubules
Rete testis
Epididymis
Paradidymis
Spermatic cord
Cremaster
Ductus deferens
Seminal gland
Ejaculatory duct
Prostate
Bulbo-urethral gland
Male external genitalia
Penis
Glans penis
Prepuce
Corpus cavernosum penis
Corpus spongiosum penis
Helicine arteries
Fascia of penis
Suspensory ligament of penis
Male urethra
Spongy urethra
Navicular fossa
Scrotum
Dartos fascia
Dartos muscle
Perineum
Perineal body
Subcutaneous perineal pouch
Superficial perineal pouch
Deep perineal pouch
Ischio-anal fossa

Abdominopelvic cavity

Abdominopelvic cavity
Extraperitoneal space
Peritoneum
Mesentery
Mesocolon
Transverse mesocolon
Sigmoid mesocolon
Meso-appendix
Lesser omentum
Hepatophrenic ligament
Hepato-esophageal ligament
Hepatogastric ligament
Hepatoduodenal ligament
Greater omentum
Gastrophrenic ligament
Gastrosplenic ligament
Phrenicosplenic ligament
Splenorenal ligament
Pancreaticosplenic ligament
Pancreaticocolic ligament
Splenocolic ligament
Phrenicocolic ligament
Peritoneal attachments of liver
Coronary ligament
Falciform ligament
Right triangular ligament
Left triangular ligament
Recesses, fossae, and folds
Omental bursa
Paracolic gutters
Median umbilical fold
Medial umbilical fold
Inguinal triangle
Lateral umbilical fold
Urogenital peritoneum
Vesico-uterine pouch
Broad ligament of uterus
Mesometrium
Mesosalpinx
Mesovarium
Suspensory ligament of ovary - see genital systems

Endocrine glands

Endocrine system
Pituitary gland
Pineal gland
Thyroid gland
Suprarenal gland
Pancreatic islets - see alimentary system

Cardiovascular system

Cardiovascular system
General terms
Artery
Heart
Chordae tendinae
Right atrium
Right ventricle
Tricuspid valve
Left atrium
Left ventricle
Mitral valve
Endocardium
Myocardium
Pericardial cavity
Transverse pericardial sinus
Pericardium
Arteries
Pulmonary trunk
Right pulmonary artery
Left pulmonary artery
Aorta
Ascending aorta
Right coronary artery
Left coronary artery
Aortic arch
Brachiocephalic trunk
Thyroid ima artery
Common carotid artery
Carotid sinus
External carotid artery
Superior thyroid artery
Ascending pharyngeal artery
Lingual artery
Facial artery
Ascending palatine artery
Submental artery
Angular artery
Occipital artery
Posterior auricular artery
Superficial temporal artery
Transverse facial artery
Zygomatico-orbital artery
Middle temporal artery
Maxillary artery
Deep auricular artery
Anterior tympanic artery
Inferior alveolar artery
Middle meningeal artery
Superior tympanic artery
Pterygomandibular artery
Masseteric artery
Anterior deep temporal artery
Posterior deep temporal artery
Buccal artery
Posterior superior alveolar artery
Infra-orbital artery
Anterior superior alveolar arteries
Artery of pterygoid canal
Descending palatine artery
Greater palatine artery
Lesser palatine arteries
Sphenopalatine artery
Internal carotid artery
Ophthalmic artery
Central retinal artery
Lacrimal artery
Short posterior ciliary arteries
Long posterior ciliary arteries
Supra-orbital artery
Anterior ethmoidal artery
Posterior ethmoidal artery
Supratrochlear artery
Dorsal nasal artery
Arteries of brain
Anterior choroidal artery
Anterior cerebral artery
Anterior communicating artery
Middle cerebral artery
Posterior communicating artery
Cerebral arterial circle (Willis)
Posterior cerebral artery
Subclavian artery
Vertebral artery
Basilar artery
Internal thoracic artery
Pericardiophrenic artery
Musculophrenic artery
Superior epigastric artery
Thyrocervical trunk
Inferior thyroid artery
Ascending cervical artery
Suprascapular artery
Transverse cervical artery
Dorsal scapular artery
Costocervical trunk
Deep cervical artery
Supreme intercostal artery
Arteries of upper limb
Axillary artery
Superior thoracic artery
Thoraco-acromial artery
Lateral thoracic artery
Subscapular artery
Thoracodorsal artery
Circumflex scapular artery
Anterior circumflex humeral artery
Posterior circumflex humeral artery
Brachial artery
Profunda brachii artery
Radial artery
Princeps pollicis artery
Radialis indicis artery
Deep palmar arch
Ulnar artery
Superficial palmar arch
Thoracic aorta
Posterior intercostal arteries
Subcostal artery
Abdominal aorta
Inferior phrenic artery
Lumbar arteries
Median sacral artery
Celiac trunk
Left gastric artery
Common hepatic artery
Gastroduodenal artery
Posterior superior pancreaticoduodenal artery
Right gastro-omental artery
Anterior superior pancreaticoduodenal artery
Right gastric artery
Hepatic artery proper
Right branch
Cystic artery
Splenic artery
Left gastro-omental artery
Short gastric arteries
Superior mesenteric artery
Inferior pancreaticoduodenal artery
Ileocolic artery
Right colic artery
Middle colic artery
Inferior mesenteric artery
Left colic artery
Sigmoid arteries
Superior rectal artery
Middle suprarenal artery
Renal artery
Ovarian artery
Testicular artery
Common iliac artery
Internal iliac artery
Iliolumbar artery
Lateral sacral arteries
Obturator artery
Superior gluteal artery
Inferior gluteal artery
Umbilical artery
Superior vesical arteries
Inferior vesical artery
Uterine artery
Vaginal artery
Middle rectal artery
Internal pudendal artery
Inferior rectal artery
Perineal artery
Arteries of lower limb
External iliac artery
Inferior epigastric artery
Cremasteric artery
Artery of round ligament of uterus
Femoral artery
Deep artery of thigh
Popliteal artery
Anterior tibial artery
Dorsalis pedis artery
Posterior tibial artery
Medial plantar artery
Lateral plantar artery
Fibular artery
Veins
Veins of heart
Coronary sinus
Great cardiac vein
Oblique vein of left atrium
Middle cardiac vein
Small cardiac vein
Pulmonary veins
Superior vena cava
Brachiocephalic vein
Inferior thyroid vein
Inferior laryngeal vein
Pericardial veins
Pericardiophrenic veins
Bronchial veins
Vertebral vein
Occipital vein
Anterior vertebral vein
Deep cervical vein
Internal thoracic veins
Superior epigastric veins
Musculophrenic veins
Anterior intercostal veins
Supreme intercostal vein
Internal jugular vein
Lingual vein
Dorsal lingual veins
Sublingual vein
Deep lingual vein
Superior thyroid vein
Middle thyroid veins
Sternocleidomastoid vein
Superior laryngeal vein
Facial vein
Angular vein
Supratrochlear veins
Supra-orbital vein
External nasal veins
Deep facial vein
External palatine vein
Submental vein
Retromandibular vein
Superficial temporal veins
Middle temporal vein
Transverse facial vein
Maxillary veins
Pterygoid plexus
External jugular vein
Posterior auricular vein
Anterior jugular vein
Suprascapular vein
Transverse cervical veins
Dural venous sinuses
Transverse sinus
Confluence of sinuses
Marginal sinus
Occipital sinus
Petrosquamous sinus
Sigmoid sinus
Superior sagittal sinus
Inferior sagittal sinus
Straight sinus
Inferior petrosal sinus
Superior petrosal sinus
Cavernous sinus
Sphenoparietal sinus
Diploic veins
Emissary veins
Cerebral veins
Superficial cerebral veins
Deep cerebral veins
Basal vein
Great cerebral vein
Veins of brainstem
Cerebellar veins
Orbital veins
Superior ophthalmic vein
Nasofrontal vein
Ethmoidal veins
Lacrimal vein
Vorticose veins
Ciliary veins
Central retinal vein
Episcleral vein
Inferior ophthalmic vein
Azygos vein
Posterior intercostal veins
Intervertebral vein
Veins of vertebral column
Anterior internal vertebral venous plexus
Basivertebral veins
Anterior spinal veins
Posterior spinal veins
Veins of upper limb
Subclavian vein
Axillary vein
Subscapular vein
Circumflex scapular vein
Thoracodorsal vein
Posterior circumflex humeral vein
Anterior circumflex humeral vein
Lateral thoracic vein
Superficial veins of upper limb
Cephalic vein
Basilic vein
Median cubital vein
Dorsal venous network of hand
Deep veins of upper limb
Brachial veins
Ulnar veins
Radial veins
Inferior vena cava
Inferior phrenic veins
Lumbar veins
Ascending lumbar vein
Hepatic veins
Renal veins
Left suprarenal vein
Left ovarian vein
Left testicular vein
Right suprarenal vein
Right ovarian vein
Right testicular vein
Pampiniform plexus
Common iliac vein
Median sacral vein
Iliolumbar vein
Internal iliac vein
Superior gluteal veins
Inferior gluteal veins
Obturator veins
Lateral sacral veins
Vesical veins
Middle rectal veins
Internal pudendal vein
Deep veins of clitoris
Deep veins of penis
Inferior rectal veins
Posterior labial veins
Posterior scrotal veins
External iliac vein
Inferior epigastric vein
Deep circumflex iliac vein
Veins of lower limb
Superficial veins of lower limb
Great saphenous vein
External pudendal veins
Small saphenous vein
Deep veins of lower limb
Femoral vein
Profunda femoris vein
Popliteal vein
Sural veins
Anterior tibial veins
Posterior tibial veins
Fibular veins
Hepatic portal vein
Cystic vein
Para-umbilical veins
Left gastric vein
Right gastric vein
Superior mesenteric vein
Right gastro-omental vein
Ileocolic vein
Appendicular vein
Right colic vein
Middle colic vein
Splenic vein
Left gastro-omental vein
Inferior mesenteric vein
Left colic vein
Sigmoid veins
Superior rectal vein
Lymphatic trunks and ducts
Thoracic duct
Cisterna chyli

Lymphoid system

Lymphatic system
Primary lymphoid organs
Bone marrow
Thymus
Secondary lymphoid organs
Spleen
Pharyngeal lymphoid ring
Lymph node
Regional lymph nodes
Lymph nodes of head and neck
Lymph nodes of upper limb
Thoracic lymph nodes
Abdominal lymph nodes
Pelvic lymph nodes
Lymph nodes of lower limb

Nervous system
Human nervous system
Central nervous system
Meninges
Spinal cord
Gray columns
White substance
Brain
Brainstem
Cerebellum
Diencephalon
Telencephalon
Cerebral hemisphere
Peripheral nervous system
Cranial nerves
Olfactory nerve
Optic nerve
Oculomotor nerve
Trochlear nerve
Trigeminal nerve
Sensory root
Trigeminal ganglion
Ophthalmic nerve
Lacrimal nerve
Frontal nerve
Supra-orbital nerve
Supratrochlear nerve
Nasociliary nerve
Posterior ethmoidal nerve
Anterior ethmoidal nerve
External nasal nerve
Infratrochlear nerve
Maxillary nerve
Nasopalatine nerve
Pharyngeal nerve
Greater palatine nerve
Lesser palatine nerves
Superior alveolar nerves
Zygomatic nerve
Infra-orbital nerve
Mandibular nerve
Masseteric nerve
Deep temporal nerves
Buccal nerve
Auriculotemporal nerve
Lingual nerve
Chorda tympani
Sublingual nerve
Inferior alveolar nerve
Nerve to mylohyoid
Mental nerve
Abducent nerve
Facial nerve
Posterior auricular nerve
Intermediate nerve
Greater petrosal nerve
Chorda tympani (also in trigeminal?  redundancy?)
Vestibulocochlear nerve
Vestibular nerve
Cochlear nerve
Glossopharyngeal nerve
Tympanic nerve
Tympanic plexus
Lesser petrosal nerve
Vagus nerve
Superior laryngeal nerve
Recurrent laryngeal nerve
Accessory nerve
Hypoglossal nerve
Spinal nerves
Cervical nerves
Suboccipital nerve
Greater occipital nerve
Third occipital nerve
Cervical plexus
Ansa cervicalis
Lesser occipital nerve
Great auricular nerve
Transverse cervical nerve
Supraclavicular nerves
Phrenic nerve
Brachial plexus
Supraclavicular part
Dorsal scapular nerve
Long thoracic nerve
Subclavian nerve
Suprascapular nerve
Subscapular nerves
Lower subscapular nerve
Upper subscapular nerve
Thoracodorsal nerve
Medial pectoral nerve
Lateral pectoral nerve
Infraclavicular part
Musculocutaneous nerve
Medial cutaneous nerve of arm
Medial cutaneous nerve of forearm
Median nerve
Ulnar nerve
Radial nerve
Axillary nerve
Thoracic nerves
Lumbar nerves
Medial clunial nerves
Sacral nerves and coccygeal nerve
Lumbar plexus
Iliohypogastric nerve
Ilio-inguinal nerve
Anterior labial nerves
Anterior scrotal nerves
Genitofemoral nerve
Lateral cutaneous nerve of thigh
Obturator nerve
Accessory obturator nerve
Femoral nerve
Saphenous nerve
Medial cutaneous nerve of leg
Lumbosacral trunk
Sacral plexus
Nerve to obturator internus
Nerve to piriformis
Nerve to quadratus femoris
Superior gluteal nerve
Inferior gluteal nerve
Posterior cutaneous nerve of thigh
Inferior clunial nerves
Perforating cutaneous nerve
Pudendal nerve
Inferior anal nerves
Perineal nerves
Posterior labial nerves
Posterior scrotal nerves
Dorsal nerve of clitoris
Dorsal nerve of penis
Coccygeal nerve
Anococcygeal nerve
Sciatic nerve
Common fibular nerve
Lateral sural cutaneous nerve
Superficial fibular nerve
Deep fibular nerve
Tibial nerve
Interosseous nerve of leg
Medial sural cutaneous nerve
Sural nerve
Medial plantar nerve
Lateral plantar nerve
Autonomic division (Autonomic nervous system)
Sympathetic part
Sympathetic trunk
Rami communicantes
Superior cervical ganglion
Middle cervical ganglion
Cervicothoracic ganglion (Stellate - should prob. include inferior cerv. ganglion)
Thoracic ganglia
Greater splanchnic nerve
Lesser splanchnic nerve
Least splanchnic nerve
Lumbar ganglia
Lumbar splanchnic nerves
Sacral ganglia
Sacral splanchnic nerves
Ganglion impar
Parasympathetic part
Cranial part
Ciliary ganglion
Short ciliary nerves
Pterygopalatine ganglion
Nerve of pterygoid canal
Submandibular ganglion
Sublingual ganglion
Otic ganglion
Pelvic part
Pelvic ganglia
Parasympathetic root of pelvic ganglia = Pelvic splanchnic nerves
Peripheral autonomic plexuses and ganglia
Craniocervical part
Internal carotid plexus
Thoracic part
Cardiac plexus
Esophageal plexus
Pulmonary plexus
Abdominal part
Celiac plexus
Aorticorenal ganglia
Superior mesenteric plexus
Inferior mesenteric plexus
Pelvic part
Superior hypogastric plexus
Inferior hypogastric plexus

Sense organs

Olfactory organ
Eye and related structures
Eyeball
Fibrous layer of eyeball
Sclera
Cornea
Vascular layer of eyeball
Choroid
Ciliary body
Ciliary processes
Ciliary muscle
Iris
Pupil
Inner layer of eyeball
Retina
Ora serrata
Optic disc
Macula
Fovea centralis
Optic nerve (see nervous system)
Retinal blood vessels (see cardiovascular system)
Lens
Chambers of eyeball
Aqueous humor
Vitreous humor
Accessory visual structures
Extra-ocular muscles
Orbitalis
Superior rectus
Inferior rectus
Medial rectus
Lateral rectus
Common tendinous ring
Superior oblique
Inferior oblique
Levator palpebrae superioris
Eyebrow
Eyelids
Palpebral fissure
Eyelash
Superior tarsus
Inferior tarsus
Tarsal glands
Ciliary glands
Conjunctiva
Lacrimal caruncle
Lacrimal apparatus
Lacrimal gland
Lacus lacrimalis
Lacrimal papilla
Lacrimal punctum
Lacrimal canaliculus
Lacrimal sac
Nasolacrimal duct
Ear
External ear
Auricle
Antitragus
Tragus
Ligaments of auricle
Auricular muscles
Helicis major
Helicis minor
Tragicus
Pyramidal muscle of auricle
Antitragicus
Transverse muscle of auricle
Oblique muscle of auricle
External acoustic meatus
Tympanic membrane
Umbo of tympanic membrane
Middle ear
Tympanic cavity
Labyrinthine wall (medial wall)
Oval window
Sinus tympani
Round window
Mastoid wall (posterior wall)
Aditus to mastoid antrum
Pyramidal eminence
Mastoid antrum
Auditory ossicles
Stapes
Incus
Malleus
Articulations of auditory ossicles
Ligaments of auditory ossicles
Muscles of auditory ossicles
Tensor tympani
Stapedius
Pharyngotympanic tube
Inner ear
Bony labyrinth
Semicircular canals
Cochlea
Modiolus
Scala vestibuli
Helicotrema
Scala tympani
Internal acoustic meatus - see bones
Perilymphatic space
Membranous labyrinth
Endolymphatic space
Vestibular labyrinth
Utricle
Saccule
Semicircular ducts
Utriculosaccular duct
Endolymphatic duct
Cochlear labyrinth
Cochlear duct
Spiral organ
Spiral ganglion
Vessels of inner ear
 Gustatory organ
Taste bud

The integument

Integumentary system
Skin
Epidermis
Dermis
Hairs
Downy hair (Lanugo)
Skin glands
Sweat gland
Sebaceous gland
Nail
Lunule
Breast
Nipple
Mammary gland
Lactiferous duct
Lactiferous sinus
Areola
Suspensory ligaments of breast
Subcutaneous tissue

History of human anatomy 

 History of anatomy
 Edwin Smith Papyrus - earliest known treatise on anatomy, from ancient Egypt circa 1600 BCE.

Organizations 
 American Association of Anatomists
 American Association of Clinical Anatomists
 British Association of Clinical Anatomists
 International Federation of Associations of Anatomists
 Anatomical Society of India
 Society of Clinical Anatomists, India
 Australia and New Zealand Association of Clinical Anatomists

Anatomists 
 Benjamin Alcock
 Jean Astruc
 Patricia Bergquist
 Vincent Bochdalek
 James Dixon Boyd
 Philipp Bozzini
 Geoffrey Bourne
 John Browne
 Charaka
 Johann Conrad Brunner
 William Cheselden
 William Cowper
 Max Fürbringer
 Antoni de Gimbernat
 Friedrich Goll
 Leonardo da Vinci
 Edwin Stephen Goodrich
 Gaspard Goyrand
 George Gulliver
 Gunther von Hagens
 Arthur Ham
 Hippocrates
 Wilhelm His Sr.
 John Hunter
 William Hunter
 Jean Baptiste Paulin Trolard
 Juan Valverde de Amusco
 Jeffrey Laitman
 Eber Landau
 Joseph Lieutaud
 Amato Lusitano
 Niko Miljanić
 Keith L. Moore
 Leo Testut
 Henri Rouvière
 Lennart Olsson
 Bronislaw Onuf-Onufrowicz
 William Charles Osman Hill
 Johann Conrad Peyer
 Prosector
 Santiago Ramón y Cajal
 Anders Retzius
 Luigi Rolando
 Olaus Rudbeck
 William Shippen
 Adriaan van den Spiegel
 Edward Charles Spitzka
 Ludwik Teichmann
 Andreas Vesalius
 Johann Gottlieb Walter
 Thomas Wharton
 Johann Winter von Andernach
 Henry Gray
 Madhusudan Gupta

See also 

 Outline of biology
 Outline of medicine
 Outline of health
 Outline of health science
 Physiology
 Human body
 Anatomy

External links 

 

 "Anatomy of the Human Body". 20th edition. 1918. Henry Gray. In public domain.
 Terminologia Anatomica on FIPAT site

Anatomy
 
Human anatomy
Human anatomy